Charles Basing was an American artist active in New York City and Provincetown, Massachusetts, in the early 20th century. In 1900–1903 he studied at the Academie Julien in Paris with William-Adolph Bouguereau, and in 1911 he became a member of the Salmagundi Club. Many of Basing's easel paintings depict the environs of New York City, and he also painted murals including the ceiling mural depicting the zodiac at Grand Central Terminal. Basing died of blood poisoning in Marrakesh Morocco on 3 February 1933,  after a camel stepped on his foot.

References

1864 births
1933 deaths
Australian painters
People from Ballarat
Australian emigrants to the United States
19th-century American painters
American male painters
20th-century American painters
19th-century American male artists
20th-century American male artists